Mymensingh Cantonment (Officially known as Momenshahi Cantonment) was the headquarters of the 19th Infantry Division of the Bangladesh Army. Presently it has the headquarters of ARTDOC which consists of its Battle Group and all the training institutions. The 77th Infantry Brigade under 19th Infantry Division is located there. The first General Officer Commanding of ARTDOC was Major General Md Zia-Ur-Rahman.

This cantonment is also the alleged site of a large-scale killing of West Pakistanis during the Bangladesh Liberation War.

References

See also 
 Military of Bangladesh

Cantonments of Bangladesh